Christmas Song is Mannheim Steamroller's eighth Christmas album overall and the group's fifth Christmas studio album. It was released in 2007 on CD by American Gramaphone, and features twelve Christmas songs. It is notable that Steamroller co-founder Jackson Berkey doesn't appear on the album.

Track listing
 "Let It Snow, Let It Snow, Let It Snow" (Sammy Cahn, Jule Styne) – 3:42
 "The Christmas Song" (vocal by Johnny Mathis) (Mel Tormé, Robert Wells) – 3:21
 "Santa Claus is Comin' to Town" (Fred Coots, Haven Gillespie) – 2:54
 "It Came Upon the Midnight Clear" (Edward Hamilton Sears, Richard Storrs Willis) – 2:45
 "Feliz Navidad" (José Feliciano) – 3:51
 "Catching Snowflakes on Your Tongue" (Chip Davis) – 4:09
 "Masters in This Hall" (William Morris, Richard Storrs Willis) – 2:45
 "Above The Northern Lights" (vocal by Gene Nery) (Davis, Ed Wilson) – 4:33
 "Frosty the Snowman" (Steve Nelson, Walter E. Rollins) – 4:24
 "Traditions of Christmas" (music box version) (Davis) – 0:36
 "Christmas Lullaby" (vocal by Olivia Newton-John) (Davis, Wilson) – 3:59
 "Have Yourself A Merry Little Christmas" (Ralph Blane, Hugh Martin) – 5:29
  "Hallelujah" (Remix) [Bonus Track]*

* Special iTunes-only bonus track.

Personnel 
Chip Davis – Recorders and drums
Tom Hartig – Alto saxophone
Bobby Jenkins – Oboe
Johnny Mathis – Solo vocal
Gene Nery – Solo vocal
Olivia Newton-John – Solo vocal
Arnie Roth – Concert master, viel
Glen Smith – 12-string guitar
Paul Winter – Soprano saxophone

References

Mannheim Steamroller Christmas Song Compact Disc. American Gramaphone AG0227-2

2007 Christmas albums
Mannheim Steamroller albums
Christmas albums by American artists
American Gramaphone albums
American Gramaphone Christmas albums
Classical Christmas albums
New-age Christmas albums